This is a list of the candidates that ran for the Christian Heritage Party of Canada in the 42nd Canadian federal election.

Alberta

British Columbia

Manitoba

Ontario

Prince Edward Island

Quebec

See also
Results of the Canadian federal election, 2015
Christian Heritage Party of Canada candidates, 2011 Canadian federal election

References

Candidates in the 2015 Canadian federal election
2015